Albert Eichelberger was an Austrian luger who competed in the 1970s. A natural track luger, he won the bronze medal in the men's singles event at the 1974 FIL European Luge Natural Track Championships.

References
Natural track European Championships results 1970-2006.

Austrian male lugers
Possibly living people
Year of birth missing